The  were a class of ten destroyers of the Imperial Japanese Navy.  Each was named after a variety of tree.

Background
It was clear that this force would not enable Japan to fulfill its obligations under the Anglo-Japanese Alliance, so the Japanese government pushed through an Emergency Naval Expansion Budget in fiscal 1914 to allow for the construction of ten new destroyers. As speed was of the essence, the orders were given to both government and civilian shipyards (as was the case with the construction of the Russo-Japanese War vintage Kamikaze-class).

The Arabe class were the most advanced destroyers in the French inventory in World War I.

Design
These 2nd class destroyers were funded under the September 1914 War Budget. The ten Kaba-class vessels were built simultaneously at eight different shipyards around Japan. As there was no time to design a new vessel, plans for the previous Sakura-class destroyers were distributed to each shipyard, with the instructions that the power plant was to be a conventional coal-fired triple expansion steam engine, and not a steam turbine.

Armament was almost the same as that of the Sakura class, with one QF 4.7 inch Gun Mk I - IV, mounted on the forecastle deck forward of the bridge, and four 3 inch 12 pounder guns, mounted one on either side and two towards the stern of the ship, with two twin torpedo launchers on rotating centreline mounts, although the latter were the new 533mm type instead of the 450mm type in the Sakura class.

Operational history
Given the speed of construction and the fact that eight different shipyards were used, it is a tribute to the Japanese shipbuilders that all ten vessels produced were uniform in appearance and capabilities, and performed reliably in their overseas deployment to the Indian Ocean and the Mediterranean Sea in combat operations in World War I. This deployment began with Rear Admiral Kozo Sato arrived in Malta in mid-April 1917, with the cruiser  as his flagship and eight Kaba-class destroyers. The Japanese fleet was nominally independent, but carried out operations under the direction of the Royal Navy command on Malta, primarily in escort operations for transport and troopship convoys and in anti-submarine warfare operations. Sakaki was damaged by the Austro-Hungarian Navy U-boat  on 11 June 1917 off of Crete with the loss of 68 of her 92 crewmen. She was salvaged and repaired.

All ten vessels survived the war, and were stricken in November 1931 and broken up.

Ships

References

Notes

Books

External links

 French Arabe class

 

Destroyer classes
 
World War I destroyers of Japan
Ships built in Japan
Japan–Malta relations